Metro Manila is home to a number of noteworthy museums and art galleries showcasing its rich history and culture. The following is a partial list of museums and art galleries in the metropolis.

See also
List of museums in the Philippines (located in provinces in Luzon, Visayas, and Mindanao regions)

References

Metro Manila
Museums in Metro Manila
 
Museums
Museums in Metro Manila